Reno is a given name, usually but not always masculine, of Spanish origin. It derives from the name Moreno.

It may refer to:

Real name
Reno Andreini (c. 1875–1880 – after 1924), Italian operatic tenor
Reno Bertoia (1935–2011), Canadian-American Major League Baseball player
Reno Browne (1921–1991), American actress sometimes billed as Reno Blair
Reno Collier, American stand-up comedian and television host
Reno L. Harnish (born 1949), Director of the Center for Environment and National Security and former American diplomat
Reno Mahe (born 1980), American retired National Football League player
Reno Olsen (born 1947), Danish retired cyclist, 1968 Olympic track team pursuit champion
Reno Thomas (1922–2009), American politician, member of the Pennsylvania House of Representatives
Reno W. Trego (1877–1961), American politician, member of the Wisconsin State Assembly
Reno Wilmots (born 1997), Belgian footballer

Stage name
Reno Wilson (born 1969), American actor, comedian and voice actor
Reno Riggins, (born 1967) ring name of professional wrestler Neal Hargrove

Fictional characters
Reno Raines, a character in the TV series Renegade played by Lorenzo Lamas
Reno Miller, main character of the film The Driller Killer
Reno Sweeney, the evangelist turned nightclub singer from Anything Goes

References

Spanish masculine given names